Family Name is a 2006 Russian-Kazakh drama film directed by Stanislav Mitin.

Plot 
The film tells about the Vozdvizhensky family who live long without children. Suddenly, their son Filipp is born, and the head of the family finds out that this is not his son and wants to leave home, but basically he can't do it. Over time, he becomes more and more attached to Philip, but cannot forgive his wife for treason. Will their marriage survive?

Cast 
 Oleg Stefan as Vozdvizhensky (as Oleg Shtefanko)
 Oksana Bazilevich as Vozdvizhensky's wife
 Sergey Barkovskiy as Viktor
 Slava Korobitsin as Filipp
 Misha Kozheurov as Filipp in the childhood

References

External links 
 

2006 films
2000s Russian-language films
Russian drama films
2006 drama films
Films based on Russian novels
Kazakhstani drama films